The 1917 Camp Jackson football team represented Camp Jackson during the 1917 college football season. The teams tackles were Josh Cody and Ted Shultz.

Schedule

References

Camp Jackson
College football undefeated seasons
Camp Jackson football